The Baikal Nature Reserve is a nature reserve and "zapovednik" on the southeast shore of Lake Baikal, in southern Buryatia, Russia. Also called Baikal Zapovednik, it was established in 1969 for preserving the nature along the lake and the neighboring central part of the Khamar-Daban Range. It hosts dark pine taiga (silver fir, cedar, spruce), thin forests, Siberian Dwarf Pine and rhododendron underbrush, subalpine meadows, and alpine tundras. The Baikal Nature Reserve is home to 812 kinds of plants, 49 types of mammals, 272 birds, 3 reptiles, 3 amphibians, and 7 types of fish. The reserve is also home to East Siberian brown bear, Baikal lynx, wolverine, otter, osprey, and golden eagle. The Baikal Nature Reserve is part of the World Network of Biosphere Reserves (also see List of biosphere reserves in the Russian Federation). The reserve is also a part of the Lake Baikal World Heritage Site. The Kabansky Nature Zakaznik, across , was transferred under the jurisdiction of the Baikal Nature Reserve in 1985.

Since March 2011 the  territory of the Altacheisky Federal Reserve in the Selenga Highlands falls under the jurisdiction of the Baikal Nature Reserve.

See also
 List of Russian Nature Reserves (class 1a 'zapovedniks')
 National parks of Russia

References

External links
 Official Website, Baikal Zapovednik

Nature reserves in Russia
Biosphere reserves of Russia
Geography of Buryatia
Protected areas established in 1969
1969 establishments in Russia
Zapovednik